The Caribbean Tourism Organizations main objective is the development of sustainable tourism for the economic and social benefit of Caribbean people.

Operations
The CTO, with headquarters in Barbados, is the Caribbean’s tourism development agency. Its member countries and territories include the Dutch, English, French and Spanish, as well as a myriad of private sector allied members. 

The CTO's vision is to position the Caribbean as the most desirable, year round, warm weather destination, and its purpose is "Leading Sustainable Tourism - One Sea, One Voice, One Caribbean."

Among other benefits, the organization provides specialized support and technical assistance in sustainable tourism development, marketing, communications, advocacy, human resource development, event planning and execution, and research and information technology.

The CTO is a marketing and business development entity dedicated to promoting the Caribbean brand worldwide.

History
The CTO was established in 1989 with the merger of the Caribbean Tourism Association (founded in 1951) and the Caribbean Tourism Research and Development Center (founded in 1974)

The body is primarily involved in the joint promotion and marketing of Caribbean tourist destinations in North America and Europe.

Member countries

French overseas departments:

Kingdom of the Netherlands:

British overseas territories:

United States territories:

See also 
 World Tourism Organization

References

CTO: Region earned over US$23b from tourism
The Caribbean Tourism Organization pushes for a more sustainable tourism product
CTO Conference on sustainable tourism
Statement by the Caribbean Tourism Organization

External links
Caribbeantravel.com - Official tourism site of the Caribbean
OneCaribbean.org - Official tourism business website of the Caribbean Tourism Organization

Tourism in the Caribbean
Business organisations based in Barbados
Tourism agencies